Lee Jae-joon (born 20 October 1990) is a South Korean actor and model. Lee received favourable reviews for his first lead coming-of-age film Night Flight (2014) for which he was nominated Best New Actor at the 2nd Wildflower Film Awards and making his name known as a rising star.

Filmography

Television series

Film

Variety show

Awards and nominations

References

External links 
 Lee Jae-joon at Management Soop
 
 

1990 births
Living people
People from Seoul
Male actors from Seoul
Models from Seoul
South Korean male television actors
South Korean male film actors